Herbert Packer Bailey  (5 December 1889 – 31 July 1917) was a Barbadian first-class cricketer and British Army officer.

Life and military career
Born in St Michael on 5 December 1889, Bailey appeared in three first-class matches for Barbados, all in the Inter-Colonial Tournament. In his debut, playing British Guiana at the Kensington Oval on 13 January 1909, Bailey scored 13 runs in his first inning, but did not bat in the second. During his next two matches, Bailey scored 8 runs and took 8 wickets for 28 runs as a bowler.

During the First World War, Bailey enlisted as a private in the Artists Rifles. He was commissioned as a temporary second lieutenant on probation in the East Surrey Regiment on 5 September 1916, becoming attached to a mortar battery. Bailey was awarded the Military Cross for bravery in action near St. Eloi on 7 June 1917. The citation read:

Bailey was killed in action several weeks later at Hollebeke on 31 July 1917. His body was not recovered or identified, and he is commemorated on the Menin Gate.

References

1889 births
1917 deaths
Barbadian cricketers
Barbados cricketers
British Army personnel of World War I
Artists' Rifles soldiers
East Surrey Regiment officers
Recipients of the Military Cross
British military personnel killed in World War I
People from Saint Michael, Barbados